The 1923–24 season was the second played by the Sphas in the Philadelphia League. This season marked some notable firsts for the team, including their first season playing over 20 games and the team's first championship. Game-by-game records not available for this season

References 

Philadelphia Sphas seasons